Milburn Morante (April 6, 1887 – January 28, 1964) was an American actor, film director and makeup artist.

Partial filmography

 The Covered Trail (1924)
 Battling Mason (1924)
 The Terror of Pueblo (1924)
 A Fighting Heart (1924)
 The Right Man (1925)
 Wolf Blood (1925)
 The Desperate Game (1926)
 Bucking the Truth (1926)
 Blue Blazes (1926)
 The Escape (1926)
 Chasing Trouble (1926)
 The Grey Devil (1926)
 Daring Deeds (1927)
 The Little Buckaroo (1928)
 Wizard of the Saddle (1928)
 The Fightin' Redhead (1928)
 The Pinto Kid (1928)
 The Freckled Rascal  (1929)
 The Vagabond Cub (1929)
 Sundown Saunders (1935)
 Skull and Crown (1935)
 Pals of the Range (1935)
 Cyclone of the Saddle (1935)
 Wild Mustang (1935)
 Blazing Justice (1936)
 Ghost-Town Gold (1936)
 Bar-Z Bad Men (1937)
 Mystery Range (1937)
 Sing, Cowboy, Sing (1937)
 Law of the Timber (1941)
 Trail of the Silver Spurs (1941)
 Buzzy and the Phantom Pinto (1941)
 Boot Hill Bandits (1942)
 Drifting Along  (1946)
 Crossed Trails (1948)
 Cowboy Cavalier (1948)
 The Fighting Ranger (1948)
 Haunted Trails (1949)
 Law of the Panhandle (1950)
 West of Wyoming (1950)
 Abilene Trail (1951)
 Blazing Bullets (1951)

References

Bibliography
 George A. Katchmer. A Biographical Dictionary of Silent Film Western Actors and Actresses. McFarland, 2009.

External links

1887 births
1964 deaths
American male film actors
American film directors
People from San Francisco
20th-century American male actors